Neal Richard Foster (August 9, 1946 – October 13, 2009) was a Democratic member of the Alaska House of Representatives, representing various districts centered on Nome, Alaska from 1989 until his death.  Though a Democrat, he frequently caucused with the Republicans and served for a period of time as the Majority Whip.

He died of a heart attack while receiving treatment for kidney disease.  His oldest son, Neal Foster, was appointed to replace him, and was elected to his own term in 2010.

At the time of his death, he was the second longest-serving member in the history of the Alaska House, behind Carl Moses, who also represented western Alaska (Max Gruenberg surpassed his tenure in October 2015).  He was also a second-generation member of the Alaska Legislature;  his father, Neal W. "Willie" Foster (1916-1979), served one term apiece in the Alaska Senate representing Nome before and following statehood.

See also
 List of Native American politicians

References

External links
 Alaska State Legislature - Representative Richard Foster
 Project Vote Smart - Representative Richard Foster (AK) profile
 Follow the Money - Richard Foster
 2006 2004 2002 2000 1998 1996 1994 1992 1990 campaign contributions
 Richard Foster at 100 Years of Alaska's Legislature

1946 births
2009 deaths
20th-century American politicians
21st-century American politicians
Aviators from Alaska
Businesspeople from Alaska
Inupiat people
Democratic Party members of the Alaska House of Representatives
Native American state legislators in Alaska
People from Nome, Alaska
University of Alaska Fairbanks alumni
20th-century American businesspeople